Mixl1 is a paired-type homeobox transcription factor weighing 27 kDa with 232 amino acids. Mixl1 transcription factor preferentially binds to the DNA sequence TAAT on the Mix gene. Mixl1 is part of the Mix/Bix family of transcription factors, with Mixl1 being the only member identified in humans. The Xenopus Mix gene and human Mix genese are homologues. Mixl1 is functionally similar to the Xenopus Mix.1.

Mixl1 is transiently expressed in the primitive streak of the gastrulating embryo, between embryonic day (E) 12 through E.19. Its expression is restricted to embryonic mesoderm precursors.

Also known as: Mix; Mix1; Mild1

Function 
Mixl1 plays a role in mesoderm patterning and tissue specification at gastrulation. It marks cells destined to be mesoderm and endoderm. Mixl1 expression is required for both mesoderm development and hematopoiesis. Mixl1 homologues are also a necessary intermediate for BMP4-induced ventral mesoderm patterning and differentiating ES cells.

Clinical Significance 
In mice, knockout of Mixl1 has resulted in embryonic death at E.8.5 due abnormalities in axial morphogenesis and a disruption of definitive endoderm. Overexpression of Mixl1 resulted in impaired hematopoietic differentiation which results in acute myeloid leukemia.  In humans Mixl1 has been detected in leukemic cells lines from biopsy samples of individuals with high-grade lymphoma.

Observed Mixl1-null mutants resulted in embryonic arrest at the early somite stage. These mutants had a thick primitive streak, abnormal head folds, absence of heart tube and gut, and enlarged midline tissue mass that replaced the notochord.

Interactions 
Mixl1 has been shown to interact with BMP4.

References 

Transcription factors
Embryology